Anderson Cordeiro Costa (born 10 October 1998), known as Anderson Cordeiro or simply Anderson, is a Brazilian professional footballer who plays as a winger for Turkish club Ankara Keçiörengücü.

Club career

Early career
Born in Bom Despacho, Minas Gerais, Anderson began his career at Famorine, a youth football school in his hometown. He then moved to Desportivo Brasil after a trial period in 2014, and played his first senior match for the club on 30 July 2016, in a 3–1 Campeonato Paulista Segunda Divisão home win over Tupã, where he scored his team's third goal.

In September 2016, Anderson moved to Atlético Mineiro, being initially assigned to the under-20 squad. He made his first team debut for Galo the following 1 March, coming on as a second-half substitute for Carlos Eduardo in a 2–2 away draw against Chapecoense, for the year's Primeira Liga; it was his maiden appearance with the main squad, and he subsequently returned to the under-20s.

On 2 March 2019, Anderson signed a contract with Taubaté until the end of the year.

Tsarsko Selo
In June 2019, after only four official appearances, Anderson moved abroad and signed for Bulgarian side FC Tsarsko Selo Sofia. He made his debut abroad on 13 July, starting in a 0–2 loss at PFC Ludogorets Razgrad.

Anderson scored his first professional goal on 29 February 2020, netting the opener in a 2–1 home success over PFC CSKA Sofia. On 25 April 2021, he scored a brace in a 4–0 home routing of FC Arda Kardzhali.

On 28 July 2021, Anderson joined Spanish Segunda División side CF Fuenlabrada on loan for one year.

References

External links

1998 births
Sportspeople from Minas Gerais
Living people
Brazilian footballers
Association football wingers
Desportivo Brasil players
Clube Atlético Mineiro players
Esporte Clube Taubaté players
FC Tsarsko Selo Sofia players
CF Fuenlabrada footballers
Casa Pia A.C. players
Ankara Keçiörengücü S.K. footballers
First Professional Football League (Bulgaria) players
Segunda División players
Primeira Liga players
TFF First League players
Brazilian expatriate footballers
Expatriate footballers in Bulgaria
Brazilian expatriate sportspeople in Bulgaria
Expatriate footballers in Spain
Brazilian expatriate sportspeople in Spain
Expatriate footballers in Portugal
Brazilian expatriate sportspeople in Portugal
Expatriate footballers in Turkey
Brazilian expatriate sportspeople in Turkey